Living Memory is the title of a series of 9 mural-size paintings on the Holocaust painted by Nabil Kanso in 1980, 1990 and 1993–94.

Works in the series
Roll-Call at the Black Wall, oil on canvas, 3 X 4.87 meters (10 X 16 feet), 1980
The Flow of Pain, oil on canvas, 3.65 X 5.50 meters (12 X 18 Feet), 1990
 Extinguishing the Light (1), oil on canvas, 3.65 X 3 meters (12 X 10 feet), 1993–94
 Extinguishing the Light (2), oil on canvas, 3.65 X 3 meters (12 X 10 feet), 1993–94
 The Gasping Flame (1), oil on canvas, 3.65 X 3 meters (12 X 10 feet), 1993–94
 The Gasping Flame (2), oil on canvas, 3.65 X 3 meters (12 X 10 feet), 1993–94
 Cries and Silence (1), oil on canvas, 3.65 X 3 meters (12 X 10 feet), 1993–94
 Cries and Silence, (2), oil on canvas, 3.65 X 3 meters (12 X 10 feet), 1993–94
 Living Memory, oil on canvas, 3.65 X 5.50 meters (12 X 18 feet), 1993–94

See also
The Floating Shadows (triptych)
Cluster Paintings

References

External links
Living Memory paintings
Installation view

Modern paintings
War paintings
Anti-war paintings
Series of paintings by Nabil Kanso
1990s paintings
Diptychs
1980 paintings